Ayar Stadium or Kyaut Tie Stadium is a multi-purpose stadium, located in downtown Pathein, Myanmar.It is the home ground of Ayeyawady United FC.

References

Football venues in Myanmar
Pathein
Multi-purpose stadiums in Myanmar
Sports venues completed in 2015